Teething is the process by which an infant's first teeth (the deciduous teeth, often called "baby teeth" or "milk teeth") appear by emerging through the gums, typically arriving in pairs.  The mandibular central incisors are the first primary teeth to erupt, usually between 6 and 10 months of age and usually causes discomfort and pain to the infant.  It can take several years for all 20 teeth to complete the tooth eruption.  Though the process of teething is sometimes referred to as "cutting teeth", when teeth emerge through the gums they do not cut through the flesh. Instead, hormones are released within the body that cause some cells in the gums to die and separate, allowing the teeth to come through.

Higher temperatures during teething are due to some form of infection, such as a herpes virus, initial infection of which is extremely widespread among children of teething age.

Signs and symptoms
The level of pain that a baby can handle will be different for each child. Some may appear to suffer more than others while they are teething. The soreness and swelling of the gums before a tooth comes through is the cause for the pain and fussiness a baby experiences during this change. These symptoms usually begin about three to five days before the tooth shows, and they disappear as soon as the tooth breaks the skin. Some babies are not even bothered by teething.

Common symptoms include drooling or dribbling, increased chewing, mood changes, irritability or crankiness, and swollen gums. Crying, sleeplessness, restless sleep at night, and mild fever are also associated with teething. Teething can begin as early as 3 months and continue until a child's third birthday. In rare cases, an area can be filled with fluid and appears over where a tooth is erupting and cause the gums to be even more sensitive. Pain is often associated more with large molars since they cannot penetrate through the gums as easily as the other teeth.

Some noticeable symptoms that a baby has entered the teething stage include chewing on their fingers or toys to help relieve pressure on their gums. Babies might also refuse to eat or drink due to the pain. Symptoms will generally fade on their own, but a doctor should be notified if they worsen or are persistent. Teething may cause signs and symptoms in the mouth and gums, but does not cause problems elsewhere in the body.

Pulling on the ears is another sign of pain; the pain in the mouth throbs throughout the baby's head so they pull their ears believing that it will provide relief. Mild rash can develop around the mouth due to skin irritation that is caused by excessive drooling or dribbling.

Sequence of appearance

The infant teeth tend to emerge in pairs – first one lower incisor emerges then the other lower incisor emerges before the next set begin to emerge.  The general pattern of emergence is:
 Lower central incisors (2) at approximately 6 months
 Upper central incisors (2) at approximately 8 months
 Upper lateral incisors (2) at approximately 10 months
 Lower lateral incisors (2) at approximately 10 months
 First molars (4) at approximately 14 months
 Canines (4) at approximately 18 months
 Second molars (4) at approximately 2–3 years

Milk teeth tend to emerge sooner in females than in males.  The exact pattern and initial starting times of teething appear to be hereditary. When and how teeth appear in an infant has no bearing on the health of the child.

Misdiagnosis as teething
Teething has not been shown to cause fever or diarrhea; however, the belief that teething causes fever is extremely common among parents. One small 1992 study found a significant rise in temperature on the day of eruption of the first tooth.

There is a risk that fever around the age of teething is dismissed as due to teething when it is actually due to illness, particularly infection by herpes viruses. "Coincidentally,  primary  tooth  eruption begins  at  about the  time that  infants  are  losing  maternal antibody protection  against  the  herpes  virus. "Younger infants  with  higher residual  levels  of  antibodies  would experience  milder infections  and  these  would be  more likely  to  go unrecognized  or  be  dismissed  as  teething  difficulty." Herpes virus infection may take the form of primary herpetic gingivostomatitis (HSV-1) or of infection by human herpesvirus 6 (HHV-6), which infects 90% of children by age 2. "The symptoms of elevated temperature and facial rash could be explainable by infection with the HHV-6 agent, which is ubiquitous among infants of teething age." Other viruses may also cause fevers which may be misattributed to teething, but the oral involvement that may occur with herpes viruses makes misdiagnosis a particular risk for such infections.

Treatment

Infants may chew on objects to aid in the teething process. Teething necklaces or bracelets are not recommended as they can cause choking, strangulation, or irritation of the mouth. Teething rings and other toys, called teethers, are often designed with textures. Some infants gain relief from chewing on cold objects. Some people freeze small chunks of fresh fruits or vegetables and put them in teething nets.

Medication
In cases where the infant is in obvious pain, some doctors recommend the use of non-steroidal anti-inflammatory drugs (NSAIDs) or child-safe pain-relief treatments containing benzocaine, lidocaine, or choline salicylate. Benzocaine must be used cautiously because it can cause methemoglobinemia; choline salicylate is related to aspirin and "may cause Reye's syndrome in susceptible children, especially those with or recovering from viral infections, or when used in combination with other NSAIDs". 5% lidocaine gel produces anaesthesia (numbing) within 2–5 minutes, lasting for 10–20 minutes. However, one author concludes that, "Overall, the risks and adverse effects from inappropriate or prolonged use of pharmacological agents outweigh their potential benefits." She points out that "the psychological trauma involved in administering medications or applying topical preparations to infants must be considered", and argues that "the placebo effect must not be overlooked. For example, applying a gel of 20% benzocaine in polyethylene glycol may give only a modest benefit over applying the placebo, which gives an efficacy of 60% compared with 90% for the active preparation."

Medicines are often applied to the babies' gums to relieve swelling and pain. These gels are similar to the toothache gel that is used by adults for sore gums and toothaches, but is administered in much smaller doses. Teething gels work as a numbing agent to dull the nerves in the gums so that the pain is less noticeable. It is important to follow the directions on the package to ensure that the correct amount of medication is administered and that proper techniques are used to reduce the risk for infection. It is important not to let the medicine numb the throat as it may interfere with the normal gag reflex and may make it possible for food to enter the lungs. Similar medicines are also available in powder form, as "teething powder".

Acetaminophen and ibuprofen are also recommended to treat the pain and swelling that babies experience. It should only be used a few times a day so that it does not mask symptoms that are being experienced due to other medical conditions and not because of teething. Products that contain aspirin should never be given to a child unless directed by a pediatrician, due to the risk of Reye's syndrome.

Some traditional medicine used to treat teething pain has been found to be harmful due to high lead content, with effects including toxic encephalopathy. "Surma" or "kohl" has traditionally been used in the Middle East and Indian subcontinent as a teething powder, as have the Middle Eastern "saoott"/"cebagin". "Santrinj" - a 98% lead oxide product otherwise used as a paint primer - is also used in the Middle East as a home remedy for teething.

History

Teething used to be considered (wrongly) a cause of death, as many children died in the first years of life, at the same time as teething occurs. "The tendency in the past to attribute serious disease to teething was so prevalent that in 1842 teething was the registered cause of death in 4.8% of all infants who died in London under the age of 1 year and 7.3% of those between the ages of 1 to 3 years according to the Registrar General's report."

Ironically, while teething is a natural process which creates little more than discomfort, some methods for relieving teething pain have caused serious harm and even death. Old remedies for teething include "blistering, bleeding, placing leeches on the gums, and applying cautery to the back of the head". In the sixteenth century the French surgeon Ambroise Paré introduced the lancing of gums using a lancet, in the belief that teeth were failing to emerge from the gums due to lack of a pathway, and that this failure was a cause of death. This belief and practice persisted for centuries, with some exceptions, until towards the end of the nineteenth century lancing became increasingly controversial and was then abandoned, although as late as 1938 an Anglo-American dental textbook advised in favour of lancing, and described the procedure. In the first half of the twentieth century, teething powders in the English-speaking world often contained calomel, a form of mercury. It was removed from most powders in 1954 when it was shown to cause "pink disease" (acrodynia), a form of mercury poisoning.

Teething toys have a long history. In England in the 17th–19th centuries, a coral meant a teething toy made of coral, ivory, or bone, often mounted in silver as the handle of a rattle. A museum curator has suggested that these substances were used as sympathetic magic, and that the animal bone could symbolize animal strength to help the child cope with pain.

See also
 Tooth eruption
 Deciduous teeth
 Permanent teeth
 Dentition

References

External links

 NHS Choices Birth to Five Planner: Teething
 NHS Choices Health A–Z: Teething
 

Infancy
Pediatrics
Teeth